The Golden Bell Award for Best Variety Show is one of the categories of the competition for the Taiwanese television production, Golden Bell Awards. It is presented annually in October by the Government Information Office, Taiwan. The first time that the television programs were first eligible to be awarded was in 1971.

Winners and nominees
TV Series program winners from 1971 to 1980 were not included in the list. For more information, see also: Golden Bell Awards list of winners

1980s

1990s

2000s

2010s

Notes

References

Variety Show, Best